Charles Nicholas "Nick" Hales  (1935–2005) was an English physician, biochemist, diabetologist, pathologist, and professor of clinical biochemistry

Biography
After education at King Edward VI Grammar School, Stafford, C. Nicholas Hales matriculated in 1953 at Trinity College, Cambridge, graduating BA (Cantab.) in 1956. He studied medicine at University College Hospital Medical School, graduating MB BChir in 1959. At University College Hospital he was a house physician under Max Rosenheim. Hales returned to the University of Cambridge for graduate study in biochemistry. He received in 1964 his PhD under the supervision of Philip Randle.

From 1964 to 1970 he was lecturer in biochemistry at the University of Cambridge. During the 1960s he was elected a Fellow of Downing College, Cambridge, taught undergraduate classes, and held an appointment at Addenbrooke’s Hospital, where he treated diabetic patients. He graduated MD in 1971. From 1970 to 1977 Hales was head of the department and an honorary consultant in chemical pathology at Cardiff's Welsh National School of Medicine. From 1977 until retirement in 2002, Hales was professor and head of the department of clinical biochemistry at the University of Cambridge and also an honorary consultant physician at Addenbrooke’s Hospital.

During the 1980s Hales did research on insulin biosynthesis and secretion. He began to investigate the evolutionary origins of prohormones and how phosphorylation is related to molecular sites of prohormone processing. He spent the academic year 1984–1985 on sabbatical leave at the laboratory of Edwin G. Krebs at the University of Washington, Seattle.

The research of Hales and Cook eventually led to the development of an important class of drugs for controlling diabetes.

Hales was a member of the editorial boards of many journals, including Clinical Science, Diabetologia, Journal of Endocrinology, Molecular and Cellular Endocrinology, Molecular Aspects of Medicine, and Molecular and Cellular Probes. He was a member of research grant committees of the British Diabetic Association from 1978 to 1982, the Medical Research Council from 1986 to 1990, and the British Heart Foundation from 1992 to 1997.

In 1959 in Westminster, London, he married Janet May Moss. They had two sons, Paul (1963–1995) and Timothy (born 1964), before their marriage ended in divorce in the late 1970s. In 1978 C. Nicholas Hales married Margaret Griffiths. They had a daughter Kathryn (b. 1979).

Awards and honours
 1992 — FRS
 1992 — Croonian Lecturer (of the RCP) on The aetiology of non-insulin-dependent diabetes
 1995 — Baly Medal
 1998 — Fellow of the Academy of Medical Sciences (FMedSci)

References

1935 births
2005 deaths
20th-century English medical doctors
Alumni of Trinity College, Cambridge
Academics of the University of Cambridge
Physicians of Addenbrooke's Hospital
Fellows of Downing College, Cambridge
Fellows of the Royal College of Physicians
Fellows of the Royal Society
Minkowski Prize recipients